Iivari Malmikoski (2 May 1927 – 25 January 2010) was a Finnish boxer. He competed in the men's welterweight event at the 1952 Summer Olympics.

References

1927 births
2010 deaths
Finnish male boxers
Olympic boxers of Finland
Boxers at the 1952 Summer Olympics
Sportspeople from Turku
Welterweight boxers